Group Selection is a 1971 book edited by George C. Williams, containing papers written by biologists arguing against the view of group selection as a major force in evolution.  The group of biologists writing on a single unified (if somewhat broad) theme contrasts with Williams' earlier seminal 1966 book Adaptation and Natural Selection, whose arguments Williams suspected to be his alone.  In particular it contains a reprint, with an erratum, of W.D. Hamilton's classic 1964 paper on inclusive fitness, "The Genetical Evolution of Social Behavior" plus a paper by John Maynard Smith entitled "The Origin and Maintenance of Sex" (pp 163–175), containing ideas on evolution of sex later developed by Maynard Smith; see especially his 1978 book The Evolution of Sex.

1971 in biology
1971 non-fiction books
American non-fiction books
Books about evolution
Books by George C. Williams
English-language books